Pound cake is a type of cake traditionally made with a pound of each of four ingredients: flour, butter, eggs, and sugar.  Pound cakes are generally baked in either a loaf pan or a Bundt mold. They are sometimes served either dusted with powdered sugar, lightly glazed, or with a coat of icing.

History
It is believed that the pound cake is of northern European origin and dates back to the early 1700s. The first U.S. cookbook, American Cookery, published in 1796, has a recipe for pound cake.

Over time, the ingredients for pound cake changed. Eliza Leslie, who wrote the 1851 edition of Direction for Cookery, used 10 eggs, beat them as lightly as possible, mixed them with a pound of flour, then added the juice of two lemons or three large oranges. This changed the flavor and texture of the cake. In the 2008 issue of Saveur, James Villas wrote that cake flour would not work in place of all-purpose flour because it lacks the strength to support the heavy batter.

An early variation on this cake replaced some of the flour with cornmeal made from dried corn (maize), which was then called Indian meal. A recipe for Indian pound cake was first published in 1828 by Eliza Leslie and later included in The Indian Meal Book, which was published in London in 1846, when people in Ireland were looking for alternatives to expensive wheat flour.

Variations

There are numerous variations on the traditional pound cake, with certain countries and regions having distinctive styles. These can include the addition of flavoring agents (such as vanilla extract or almond extract) or dried fruit (such as currants or dried cranberries), as well as alterations to the original recipe to change the characteristics of the resulting pound cake. For instance, baking soda or baking powder may be incorporated to induce leavening during baking, resulting in a less dense pound cake. A cooking oil (typically a vegetable oil) is sometimes substituted for some or all of the butter, which is intended to produce a moister cake.  Sour cream pound cake is a popular variation in the United States, which involves the substitution of sour cream for some of the butter, which also is intended to produce a moister cake with a tangy flavor.  Some of these variations may drastically change the texture and flavor of the pound cake, but the name pound cake is often still used.  Some of the variations are described below.

French style
Pound cake is served in France. The name of the pound cake , means four quarters. There are equal weights in each of the four quarters. In tradition, the popular cake of the French region of Brittany, as its name implies, uses the same quantity of the four ingredients, but with no added fruit of any kind. However, the Caribbean parts of the world that speak French traditionally add rum to the ingredients for Christmas Eve or even mashed bananas for extra moisture. In some cases, the French might have beaten egg whites instead of whole eggs to lighten the batter. Other variants include adding chocolate or lemon juice for flavor.

Mexican style
In Mexico, the pound cake is called . The basic recipe of Mexican  is much like the traditional U.S. recipe.

Colombian and Venezuelan style
Ponqué is the Colombian and Venezuelan version of the pound cake: the term  is itself a Spanish phonetic approximation of pound-cake. The ponqué is essentially a wine-drenched cake with a cream or sugar coating, and it is very popular at birthdays, weddings and other social celebrations.

German style

The German term Rührkuchen (stirred cake) refers to any kind of cake where a batter is made by mixing flour, butter, eggs, sugar, and often milk. The concept of the first four ingredients having equal proportions is not common, but, nevertheless, this style of cake batter forms the basis of many popular cake recipes. With the simple addition of nuts, cocoa, dried fruits and alcohols, and the use of different shapes and sizes of tins, a wide variety of traditional German cakes are made. For example, this dough or a minor variation of it is often used to make cakes made in a loaf tin ( - orange cake;  - hazelnut cake), marbled cakes in a bundt tin and other flavor combinations in shaped tins ( - fake venison saddle with bitter chocolate and almonds, Osterlamm - Easter Lamb with vanilla and rum).
 
In the technical language of professional baking, these recipes are classified as Eischwerteig mit Fett ("egg-heavy batter with shortening"). For example, in a German cooks' vocational school book from the 1980s the basic recipe for such a cake baked in a 26 cm (10") spring form tin is given as four eggs, three egg-weights of butter, four egg-weights of sugar, three egg weights of flour and one egg-weight of starch. It is close to the English pound of each and the French four equal quarters.

Cherry cake

Cherry cake is a traditional British cake. The cake consists of glacé cherries evenly suspended within a Madeira sponge; it can also be considered as a basic or trivial variation of pound cake. Glacé cherries are used because the moisture within fresh cherries causes them to sink to the bottom of any cake, ruining the cake's form.

Cakes with cherries inside them are found in many other cuisines.

See also
Madeira cake

References

External links

 http://www.cooksinfo.com/pound-cake

British cakes
Butter cakes
American cakes
French cakes
German cakes
Mexican desserts
Cakes